Artemiz may refer to:

 Artemiz, an alternative name for Artemis, a goddess in the DC Comics Universe
 , a destroyer, formerly HMS Sluys

See also
 Artemis (disambiguation)